Aerial perspective or atmospheric perspective refers to the effect on the appearance of an object by the atmosphere between it and a viewer.

Aerial perspective may also refer to:

 aerial photography
 aerial landscape art
 bird's-eye view, elevated view of an object from above
 top-down perspective

Perspective projection